The castra of Drumul Carului was a fort in the Roman province of Dacia. The small fort was defended by earthenwork and by two small ditches. It might have been erected following the First Dacian War, before the official integration of Dacia to the Roman Empire. Destroyed by fire, the fort was abandoned around 250. Its ruins are located in Drumul Carului (commune Moieciu, Romania).

See also
List of castra

Notes

External links
Roman castra from Romania - Google Maps / Earth

Roman legionary fortresses in Romania
Ancient history of Transylvania
Historic monuments in Brașov County